Boechler v. Commissioner, 596 U.S. ___ (2022), was a United States Supreme Court case related to Title 26 of the United States Code   (aka. Internal Revenue Code) and equitable tolling.

In a unanimous decision by the court, they ruled that 30 day timeline is non-jurisdictional and is protected by equitable tolling.

Background 
On June 5, 2015, the Internal Revenue Services (IRS), sent a letter to Boechler, P.C. after noting a discrepancy with their prior submission of tax documents. Boechler, a North Dakota law firm, ignored the letter sent by the IRS, which led to them being imposed a 10% intentional disregard penalty. Similarly, Boechler did not pay the penalty. The IRS informed Boechler of their intent to levy, in which Boechler responded but did not establish reasonable grounds for relief.

The Independent Office of Appeals, the only method to settle a tax dispute without tax litigation in court, sustained the levy and sent Boechler the notice of determination on July 28, 2017. The notice of determination was received by Boechler on July 31, 2017, but it stated that they had to submit a petition for a Collection Due Process (CDP) hearing within 30 days (by August 28, 2017).

On August 29, Boechler submitted their petition for a CDP hearing, a day after the stated 30-day deadline. The IRS argued in the United States Tax Court that the court lacked jurisdiction to hear the case and requested the court to dismiss the case. The Tax Court agreed and dismissed the petition.

Boechler appealed this decision to the United States Court of Appeals for the Eighth Circuit arguing that the 30-day time limit is not jurisdictional, should be covered by equitable tolling, and to calculate the time limit from the issuance of the levy instead of the date of receiving the levy is in violation of due process.

In a 3-0 decision, the Eighth Circuit affirmed the Tax Court's decision and reiterated that the Tax Court has no jurisdiction for untimely petitions for review.

Boechler filed a petition for writ of certiorari to the Supreme Court of the United States.

Supreme Court 
The court granted certiorari on September 30, 2021, and heard oral arguments on January 12, 2022. On April 21, 2022, the Supreme Court reversed and remanded the lower court judgements in a unanimous opinion by Justice Amy Coney Barrett.

She contends that the Commissioner's interpretation could be better than the petitioners, but the bottom line is that it is "not clear" and therefore rejecting the Commissioner's interpretation of "such matters" referring to the 30 day deadline as jurisdictional. She adds that such non-jurisdictional deadline would not help Boechler unless it is able to be equitably tolled, calling equitable tolling "traditional feature of American jurisprudence".

References

External links 

2022 in United States case law
United States Supreme Court cases
United States Supreme Court cases of the Roberts Court
United States statutory interpretation case law
United States taxation and revenue case law
United States Tax Court cases